Diego Villanueva (Rio de Janeiro, September 15, 1990), better known by his stage name Diego Thug, is a Brazilian singer-songwriter. He is the lead singer and co-founder of the group Bonde da Stronda.

History
Diego Villanueva was born on September 15, 1990 in Rio de Janeiro. In 2006, along with Léo Schulz, he founded the group Bonde da Stronda. He is the main songwriter of the group. In their lyrics he portrays his life and that of his friends, talking about their daily reality and histories, usually about partying, girls, friends and his career.

On December 7, 2012, Diego released his single "Tem Espaço? Faz Tatuagem!" along with a music video. The song tells his passion for tattoos.

He currently owns a record label called ZeroUM Records that continues to release solo works, with "Bonde da Stronda" and other artists.

Personal life
Diego dated the singer Anitta between the years 2011 and 2012. The two posed for a photo session and planned to launch a music video together, which was canceled with their breakup in late 2012.

Discography

Albums
Solo
2015 – SMOKE SWAG
2016 – THUGLUV
2017 – NOVEMBRO
2019 – SMOKE SWAG II
2020 – THUGLUV II
with Bonde da Stronda
 2008 - Stronda Style
 2009 - Nova Era da Stronda
 2011 - A Profecia
 2012 - Corporação
 2013 - Feito pras Damas
 2013 - O Lado Certo da Vida Certa
 2015 - GOLD
 2017 - Principium
2020 - Praiana
2020 - Motorhead

Singles
Solo
 2008 – "Verdadeira Vantagem" (feat. TonzA)
 2008 – "S.T.R.O.N.D.A" (feat. TonzA & MC Lipy)
 2009 – "Memorias"
 2009 – "Ponto de Equilíbrio" 
 2012 – "Tem Espaço? Faz Tatuagem!"
 2013 – "O Bem Que Eu Preciso"

Collaborations
 2009 – Chaparraus Nutrs: "Alerta Brasil" (feat. Mr. Thug)
 2010 – Diwali: "Melhor Assim" (feat. Mr. Thug)
 2011 – TonzA: "Faço Tudo que Quiser" (feat. Mr. Thug)
 2013 – Terra Preta: "O Bonde Segue" (feat. Mr. Thug)
 2013 – Michael Puga [MP]: "Querem Tramar Meu Fim" (feat. Mr. Thug)
 2013 – Hevo84: "Minha Pira" (feat. Mr. Thug)
 2016 – Cyber: "Olha Ela" (feat. Mr. Thug, MC Tchesko e Don)

References

Brazilian hip hop musicians